TNC may refer to:

Computers
 Triangular network coding, a packet coding scheme
 Trusted Network Connect, an open architecture for computer network access control

Education
 Trevecca Nazarene College, now called Trevecca Nazarene University, Nashville, Tennessee, U.S.
 Turkmen National Conservatory, a music conservatory in Ashgabat, Turkmenistan

Science and medicine
 Tenascin C or TN-C, a protein encoded by the TNC gene
 Thymic nurse cells

Arts, entertainment, and media
 Teatre Nacional de Catalunya, a public theatre in Barcelona, Catalonia, Spain
 Television Nishinippon Corporation, a TV station in Fukuoka, Japan
 Telenovela Channel, a telenovela-based cable channel in the Philippines
 The New Criterion, a monthly literary magazine based in New York City, New York, U.S.
 Theater for the New City, New York City, New York, U.S.

Other uses
 Terminal node controller, a device used by amateur radio operators
 The Nature Conservancy, an environmental organization headquartered in Arlington, Virginia, U.S.
 TNC connector, a type of coaxial cable connector
 Toronto Neighbourhood Centres
 Transnational corporation, corporations that do not identify with any one country
 Transportation network company, a legal term for a ridesharing company in certain jurisdictions
 tnc, ISO 639-3 code for Tanimuca-Retuarã language
 Team and Concepts (TnC), a Hong Kong-based company that produced the online spreadsheet EditGrid
 Tripartite Naval Commission, a 1945 naval commission formed to allocate seized German ships and submarines
 A contractual term, otherwise known as "terms and conditions"